Emma Vickers is a female international table tennis player from England.

Table tennis career
She represented England at the 2008 World Table Tennis Championships in the Corbillon Cup (women's team event) with Joanna Parker and Kelly Sibley.

She won three Under 21 English National Table Tennis Championships titles. Her representative county is Derbyshire.

See also
 List of England players at the World Team Table Tennis Championships

References

English female table tennis players
Living people
1991 births